Tokke may refer to:

Tokke, a municipality in Vestfold og Telemark county, Norway
Tokke (river), a river in Vestfold og Telemark county, Norway
Tokke, also spelled Toke, a lake in Vestfold og Telemark county, Norway
Tokke Hydroelectric Power Station, a hydroelectric power plant in Vestfold og Telemark county, Norway